Lal Durbar is a Rana palace in Kathmandu, the capital of Nepal. The palace complex, located East of the Narayanhity Palace, was incorporated in an impressive and vast array of courtyards, gardens and buildings. Lal Durbar was built by Bir Shamsher JBR in 1890 CE.

History
Lal Durbar was built by Bir Shumsher JBR in 1890 CE for his youngest wife Topkumari Devi. Occupying a land area of 300 ropani with Seto Durbar towards its south. In 1901 Tej Shumsher, Bir Shumsher JBRs fourth son inherited this palace. In 1934 March by Juddha Shumsher JBR exiled Tej Shumsher to Narayani Zone and captured all his property along with Lal Durbar. but in 1951 by end of Rana rule Lal Durbar was reclaimed by Tej Shumsher's sons.

See also
Bhimsen Thapa
Mathabarsingh Thapa
Jung Bahadur Rana

References

Rana palaces of Nepal
Palaces in Kathmandu
Former palaces in Nepal